The Jacob Hunter House near New Liberty, Kentucky is a historic Federal vernacular-style house built in 1818.  It was listed on the National Register of Historic Places in  1987.

It was built by Revolutionary War veteran Jacob Hunter, whose grandson was Lafayette Hunter.  The site preserves the ruins of an early stone house, the only such site in Owen County, Kentucky and the only one-bay stone house in the state.  In 1984 it was noted to be a "good historic archaeologic site; unchanged except by nature."

See also 
 New Liberty Historic District
 National Register of Historic Places listings in Owen County, Kentucky

References

Houses on the National Register of Historic Places in Kentucky
Federal architecture in Kentucky
Houses completed in 1818
National Register of Historic Places in Owen County, Kentucky
1818 establishments in Kentucky
Archaeological sites on the National Register of Historic Places in Kentucky